Outside the Chicago area:
Muddy River Opera Company

In the Chicago area:

Illinois culture
Illinois
Theaters